The Colbinabbin Football Club is an Australian Rules Football club which competes in the HDFL.

The club, known as the Colbinabbin Grasshoppers, is based in Colbinabbin, Victoria and has participated in the HDFL since 1935.

The Grasshoppers have appeared in 21 grand finals, winning twelve; the most recent in 2008.

Location

History

Successful Years (1998 – 2008)
Colbinabbin hadn't won a flag in seven years and prior hadn't won a flag in thirteen years and weren't in the Finals very often. Success was scarce and would only come around every now and then for the Grasshoppers however this changed after back to back Premiership wins in '98 & '99. Soon after their successive back to back Premiership wins they were back again this time winning three flags in a row ('02, '03, '04) and then becoming the second most premiership wins in the HDFL only after Mount Pleasant with 17.

The Rebuild (2013 – present)
Since 2009 Colbinabbin haven't played in a Grand Final, and have only featured in the finals three times. Despite this they have a very talented team and are always a tough team to play home or away and have got a lot of history behind them which not all teams have in the HDFL.

Rivalries
Because of the small sized football league rivalries are few and far between and most teams aren't overly aggressive towards another team, however Colbinabbins main rivals are Heathcote, LBU, Elmore, Leitchville Gunbower & North Bendigo.

Honours
HDFL

Premierships

Books
 History of Football in the Bendigo District – John Stoward –

References

Australian rules football clubs in Victoria (Australia)